Mount Lumarku or Lumaku is a mountain in West Coast Division of Sabah, Malaysia. The pitcher plant species Nepenthes fusca, N. hurrelliana, and N. tentaculata are native to this mountain.

References 

Lumarku
Protected areas of Sabah
Hiking trails in Malaysia